John Brooks (born December 8, 1949) is an American politician who served as a Democratic member of the New York State Senate from the 8th district from 2017–2023.

Early life and education
Born and raised on Long Island, Brooks earned an associate's degree from Farmingdale State College and a Bachelor of Arts degree from the New York Institute of Technology.

Career
Brooks served for more than forty-five years with the Seaford, New York Fire Department. Brooks subsequently served as a member of the Seaford Board of Education. An insurance broker, Brooks also worked for Geico and United States Capital Insurance, and later served as Nassau County's Director of Risk Management. Brooks also served in the armed services as with the Rainbow Division of the New York Army National Guard as a medic.

New York State Senate 
In 2016, Brooks chose to run for the 8th Senate District seat held by Michael Venditto. Despite being a registered Republican, Brooks chose to accept the Democratic line. Brooks was unopposed in the primary. In October after the arrest of Venditto's father, Supervisor John Venditto, on corruption charges, along with Ed Mangano, Brooks finally decided to campaign for the seat. The Democratic Senate Campaign Committee and Brooks viewed Venditto as a free target despite having nothing to do with the scandal.

On election night, Venditto was thought to have won by more than 2,000 votes, but when additional ballots were counted, Brooks pulled into the lead by less than 100 votes. Ballots were subsequently recounted. In the end, Brooks won by only 314 votes out of over 150,000 cast to take the seat.

In the 2018 election, Brooks defeated Republican challenger Jeff Pravato by more than 10,000 votes. Effective January 2019, Brooks has been named Chair of the Veterans, Homeland Security and Military Affairs Committee.

His district includes portions of Amityville, Freeport, Lindenhurst and Massapequa Park as well as the unincorporated villages of Baldwin, Baldwin Harbor, Bellmore, Copiague, East Farmingdale, East Massapequa, Massapequa, Merrick, North Amityville, North Bellmore, North Lindenhurst, North Merrick, Roosevelt, Seaford, South Farmingdale, Wantagh, West Babylon, Wheatley Heights and Wyandanch on Long Island. Brooks, despite being a member of the Democratic caucus, was a registered Republican until after the 2017 local elections.

In 2022, Brooks voted with all Senate Democrats against getting rid of school mask mandates.

References

External links
Senator John E. Brooks official site

Living people
New York (state) Democrats
New York (state) Republicans
People from Seaford, New York
Farmingdale State College alumni
New York Institute of Technology alumni
New York (state) state senators
21st-century American politicians
Place of birth missing (living people)
1949 births